Jean-Claude Jacques Ducan Darcheville (born 25 July 1975) is a French Guianese former professional footballer who played as a striker. He played for various clubs in France, England, Scotland, and Greece. He represented French Guiana at the 2012 Caribbean Cup.

Career

Early career
Darcheville was born in Sinnamary, French Guiana. He began his professional career in France at Rennes. He played his first game for Rennes in a 3–1 defeat to Monaco in 1995. He spent three seasons at Rennes, scoring five goals in 42 matches.

He then joined English Premier League club Nottingham Forest on loan for a season but failed to settle, scoring only two goals in 16 matches. He was still coming to terms with the death of his wife and children in a car accident in 1998.

Return to France
After a disappointing season in England, Darcheville decided to continue his career in France and joined Lorient. He spent three seasons with Lorient, scoring 44 goals in 102 matches, including the winning goal in the Coupe de France as Lorient beat Bastia 1–0. He was also on the losing side in the Coupe de la Ligue final as Lorient lost 3–0 to Bordeaux.

When Lorient were relegated from the top-flight Ligue 1, Darcheville joined Bordeaux. During the previous season, he had scored 19 goals in 32 matches for the doomed Lorient and his good form continued for Bordeaux, where he scored 11 league goals in his first season. Overall, he scored 37 goals in 131 league games and netted seven goals in European competition.

Rangers
Darcheville signed a two-year contract with Scottish side Rangers on 9 May 2007 to join the club on 1 July. He was signed by Walter Smith, after Rangers' two previous managers, Alex McLeish and Paul Le Guen, were also linked with him. Darcheville made his Rangers debut against Montenegrin side Zeta on 31 July 2007, in a 2–0 victory. He then went on to score his first and second goals for the club in a match against Falkirk on 18 August 2007.

On 12 December 2007, in Rangers' final "make-or-break" 2007–08 UEFA Champions League match against Lyon, Darcheville missed an open goal from five yards out and was later sent off for stamping on Kim Källström. He later received a three match suspension for this offence and missed the UEFA Cup third round tie against Panathinaikos (Rangers would eventually go through to the next round on the away goals rule after drawing 1–1 in Athens) and was also unavailable for the first leg of the last-16 clash with German side Werder Bremen. Darcheville did, however, score away from home in the next round against Sporting CP, and helped Rangers defeat Fiorentina to reach the final against Zenit Saint Petersburg. Rangers lost the final 2–0; the game was Darcheville's only full match for the club. Darcheville scored his first goal of the 2008–09 season, and his first in six months for Rangers, against Aberdeen on 22 November in a 2–0 win at Ibrox. This was to prove to be his last goal for the Ibrox club.

Later career
Darcheville left Rangers on 1 January 2009 to join Valenciennes in France.

On 7 August 2009, Nantes signed Darcheville on a free transfer until the end of the 2009–10 season.

On 28 August 2010, Darcheville signed a one-year contract for Kavala of Greece.

Honours
Lorient
Coupe de France: 2001–02

Bordeaux
Coupe de la Ligue: 2006–07

Rangers
Scottish Cup: 2007–08
Scottish League Cup: 2007–08
UEFA Cup runner-up: 2007–08

References

External links

1975 births
Living people
Sportspeople from Cayenne
French footballers
France under-21 international footballers
Association football forwards
Stade Rennais F.C. players
Nottingham Forest F.C. players
FC Lorient players
FC Girondins de Bordeaux players
Rangers F.C. players
Valenciennes FC players
FC Nantes players
Ligue 1 players
Premier League players
Ligue 2 players
Scottish Premier League players
French expatriate footballers
Expatriate footballers in England
Expatriate footballers in Scotland
French expatriate sportspeople in England
French expatriate sportspeople in Scotland
French people of French Guianan descent
People from Sinnamary